Adam Swift (born 20 February 1993) is an English professional rugby league footballer who plays as a er for Hull F.C. in the Betfred Super League.

He has played for St Helens in the Super League, and spent time on loan from the Saints at Whitehaven in the Championship, and the Rochdale Hornets in Championship 1 and the Championship. Swift has also spent time away from St Helens on loan at the Sheffield Eagles and the Leigh Centurions in the Betfred Championship. He won the 2014 Super League Grand Final with his hometown club St Helens.

Background
Adam Swift was born and has lived in St Helens, Merseyside, England all his life. In his secondary education, he attended Cowley International College.

Career
Swift made his St Helens Super League début in 2012. 

His number was 26 but for the 2014 season, he wore the number 5 as first choice winger. 

Swift made some appearances for Whitehaven as fullback on dual registration from St Helens. 

St Helens reached the 2014 Super League Grand Final, and Swift was selected to play on the wing in their 14-6 victory over the Wigan Warriors at Old Trafford.

In round 9 of the 2021 Super League season, Swift scored two tries for Hull F.C. in a 30-12 victory over Castleford.
The following week, he scored another two tries as Hull F.C. defeated Leigh 64-22.

References

External links

St Helens profile
Saints Heritage Society profile
SL profile

1993 births
Living people
English rugby league players
Hull F.C. players
Leigh Leopards players
Rochdale Hornets players
Rugby league players from St Helens, Merseyside
Rugby league wingers
Sheffield Eagles players
St Helens R.F.C. players
Whitehaven R.L.F.C. players